In modular arithmetic, Barrett reduction is a reduction algorithm introduced in 1986 by P.D. Barrett. A naive way of computing

would be to use a fast division algorithm.

General idea 

Then

where  denotes the floor function.

Single-word Barrett reduction 

Barrett initially considered an integer version of the above algorithm when the values fit into machine words.

When calculating  using the method above, but with integers, the obvious analogue would be to use division by :

func reduce(a uint) uint {
    q := a / n  // Division implicitly returns the floor of the result.
    return a - q * n
}

However, division can be expensive and, in cryptographic settings, may not be a constant-time instruction on some CPUs.

In order to calculate the best value for  given  consider:

Thus  is generally used.

Thus we can approximate the function above with:

func reduce(a uint) uint {
    q := (a * m) >> k // ">> k" denotes bitshift by k.
    return a - q * n
}

A conditional subtraction will correct this:

func reduce(a uint) uint {
    q := (a * m) >> k
    a -= q * n
    if n <= a {
        a -= n
    }
  return a
}

Since  is only an approximation, the valid range of  needs to be considered.

As long as  then the reduction is valid thus . The reduction function might not immediately give the wrong answer when  but the bounds on  must be respected to ensure the correct answer in the general case.

Example 

Consider the case of  when operating with 16-bit integers.

The smallest value of  that makes sense is  because if  then the reduction will only be valid for values that are already minimal! For a value of seven, . For a value of eight . For , we get , which is a better approximation.

In the first case,  so  implies . Since  is an integer, effectively the maximum value is 478. (In practice the function happens to work for values up to 504.)

(In practice the function happens to work until 7473.)

The next value of  that results in a better approximation is 13, giving . However, note that the intermediate value  in the calculation will then overflow an unsigned 16-bit value when , thus  works better in this situation.

Proof for range for a specific k 

Let  be the smallest integer such that . As in the code snippets above, let

  and
 .

Also, if  then . In that case, writing the snippets above as an expression:

The proof that  follows:

If , then

Multi-word Barrett reduction 

Barrett's primary motivation for considering reduction was the implementation of RSA, where the values in question will almost certainly exceed the size of a machine word. In this situation, Barrett provided an algorithm that approximates the single-word version above but for multi-word values. For details see section 14.3.3 of the Handbook of Applied Cryptography.

Barrett algorithm for polynomials 

It is also possible to use Barrett algorithm for polynomial division, by reversing polynomials and using X-adic arithmetic.

See also 

 Montgomery reduction is another similar algorithm.

References

Sources 

Computer arithmetic
Modular arithmetic